Fraham is a municipality in the district of Eferding in the Austrian state of Upper Austria.

Geography
Fraham lies in the Hausruckviertel region. About 1 percent of the municipality is forest and 14 percent farmland.

References

Cities and towns in Eferding District